The National Military History Museum is a museum dedicated to military history in Sofia, Bulgaria. A structure of the Ministry of Defence, it has existed under various names and subordinate to various institutions since 1 August 1914 (in practice since 4 July 1916). It consists of 5,000 m2 of indoor and 40,000 m2 outdoor (of which 500 m2 covered) exhibition area, changing exhibits, a library and a computer centre.

Establishment 
The NMMH was established in 1916, two years after a military-historical commission, consisting of an archive, exhibition and library, was founded. By that time it was one of only three Bulgarian museums in existence. Its first complete exhibition was only unveiled in 1937. Its current structure and name date from 1968.

Outdoor exhibition
An incomplete list of equipment on display.

Artillery

Missiles
  9K52 Luna-M
  R-17 Elbrus
  OTR-23 Oka
  S-75 Dvina
  2K11 Krug

Military vehicles

Tanks

Aircraft

Other
Spasov M1944 Trigun

References

External links

 Official website

Military History
Museums in Sofia
Military and war museums in Bulgaria
Tank museums